The Bianjing Drum Tower, also known as the Bianjing Pavilion and by its Chinese name as the Bianjing Lou, is a drum tower in Shangguan, the seat of Dai County, Xinzhou Prefecture, Shanxi, in the People's Republic of China.

History
Yanmen Pass was an important defensive choke point for ancient and medieval China. The nearest major town to its south was the seat of what is now Dai County, previously known variously as Guangwu, Yanmen, and Daizhou. The tower was constructed in Hongwu 7 (1374 CE), for the purpose of military observation and signaling by means of drums. That original structure was destroyed by a fire in Chenghua 7 (1471). The present tower was built on the site of the first in Chenghua 12 (1476). It was further restored 4 times under the Qing, as well as in 1957, 1976, and 1986 under the People's Republic. The more recent renovations dealt with water damage on the first floor. The Bianjing Drum Tower was named a Major Historical and Cultural Site Protected at the National Level by the State Administration of Cultural Heritage in 2001.

Structure
The wooden tower faces south. Its two large placards read "First Tower of Yanmen" (t s Yànmén Dìyī Lóu) and "Audible in All Directions" (t s Shēng Wén Sì Dá).

Museum
The tower holds a local museum. One artifact is a -tall stone lantern (t s dēngtái) that was carved into the shape of Mount Wutai in Dongzhang .

See also
 Yanmen Pass
 Inner Great Wall & Ming Great Wall
 List of Major National Historical and Cultural Sites in Shanxi

References

Citations

Bibliography
 .
 .
 .
 . & 
 . 
 .

External links

 《边靖楼》 at Baike.com 

Towers in China
Major National Historical and Cultural Sites in Shanxi
1374 establishments
1476 establishments
Ming dynasty architecture
Xinzhou
Drum towers